Radway is a hamlet in central Alberta, Canada within Thorhild County.

Demographics 

See also 
Krause Milling Co.
List of communities in Alberta
List of former urban municipalities in Alberta
List of hamlets in Alberta

References 

Designated places in Alberta
Former villages in Alberta
Hamlets in Alberta
Populated places disestablished in 1996
Thorhild County